"Award Tour" is a song by A Tribe Called Quest, released as the first single from their third album Midnight Marauders. The song features rapper Trugoy on the chorus, from the fellow Native Tongues group De La Soul. It contains a sample of "We Gettin' Down" by Weldon Irvine, from his 1975 album Spirit Man. The B-side of the single is the original version of the Midnight Marauders track "The Chase, Pt. 2", which notably features the first known verse by future Tribe collaborator Consequence. "Award Tour" remains Tribe's highest charting single to date on the Billboard Hot 100, peaking at number 47. It also topped the Billboard Dance Singles chart.

The second half of the song's chorus calls out names of cities and states in this order: New York City, New Jersey, North Carolina, Virginia, Oakland, Los Angeles, San Francisco, St. John, Chi-town, Spokane, London, Tokyo, Houston, Delaware, Washington, D.C., Dallas, South Carolina, Maryland, New Orleans, and Detroit. Additionally, one line in the second verse mentions two Major League Baseball teams, the Atlanta Braves and New York Yankees.

Background
Speaking with Vibe, Q-Tip revealed his process for the song's production:

Music video
The music video for "Award Tour" was released in November 1993 and features an appearance by De La Soul. The video was filmed within the borders of a painting and features Q-Tip and Phife Dawg rapping in New York City while De La Soul member Trugoy sings the chorus.

Charts

References

1993 singles
A Tribe Called Quest songs
Songs written by Q-Tip (musician)
1993 songs
Jive Records singles
Song recordings produced by Q-Tip (musician)
Songs written by Phife Dawg
Songs written by Ali Shaheed Muhammad